"My Number One" is the twelfth single by the Dutch girl group Luv', released in the autumn of 1980 by CNR/Carrere Records. The song appears on the Forever Yours album and was a chart success in Benelux and a minor hit in Germany. "My Number One" served as the official introduction to the public and the media of Luv's new member, Ria Thielsch (who replaced Patty Brard).

Song information
Patty Brard suddenly left Luv' in August 1980 as the group was promoting One More Little Kissie. This departure had a negative impact as the group had legal obligations and had already recorded new material for an album. A new member was quickly added: Ria Thielsch (who like Patty had Indonesian and New Guinean origins). Though she made some appearances by performing One More Little Kissie on stage and on TV, Ria was officially introduced with the release of a new single: "My Number One". The track is a pop tune with military march-style elements and is considered Luv's best composition according to Hans van Hemert, the trio's producer.

Commercial performance
The song was a top five hit in the Netherlands and in Flanders (Belgium). It was Luv's last chart entry outside Dutch-speaking countries, ending the group's succession of export hits. It reached number 60 in Germany.

Charts

Weekly charts

Year-end charts

References

1980 singles
1980 songs
Luv' songs
Songs written by Hans van Hemert
Songs written by Piet Souer
Carrere Records singles